Marius Mihai Coporan (born 13 December 1975) is a Romanian former footballer who played as a midfielder and defender.

Honours
Steaua București
Divizia A: 1997–98
Cupa României: 1998–99
Supercupa României: 1998
Dinamo București
Divizia A: 1999–00
Cupa României: 1999–00

References

1975 births
Living people
Romanian footballers
Romania youth international footballers
Romania under-21 international footballers
Association football midfielders
Liga I players
Liga II players
Süper Lig players
FC Dinamo București players
FC Steaua București players
ASC Daco-Getica București players
CS Inter Gaz București players
Altay S.K. footballers
Romanian expatriate footballers
Expatriate footballers in Turkey
Romanian expatriate sportspeople in Turkey